Castrum Caput Bubali was a fort in the Roman province of Dacia. It is located in Delinești (commune Păltiniș, Romania).

See also
List of castra

Notes

External links
Roman castra from Romania - Google Maps / Earth

Roman Dacia
Archaeological sites in Romania
Roman legionary fortresses in Romania
History of Banat